The Cross River is a  tidal river in Maine.  It is a tributary of the Sheepscot River.

The Cross River begins in the town of Boothbay and runs north. Turning west, it becomes the boundary between Boothbay and Edgecomb and continues to the Sheepscot River, at the three-way town boundary intersection between Boothbay, Edgecomb, and Westport.

See also
List of rivers of Maine

References

Maine Streamflow Data from the USGS
Maine Watershed Data From Environmental Protection Agency

Rivers of Lincoln County, Maine
Rivers of Maine